Chamaesphecia doryceraeformis is a moth of the family Sesiidae. It is found in Turkey, Iran and Transcaucasia.

Adult males have been observed feeding on flowers or resting on Astragalus plants.

The larvae feed on Phlomis capitata.

References

Moths described in 1853
Sesiidae
Insects of Turkey